Captain Skyhawk is a scrolling shooter video game developed by Rare and published by Milton Bradley Company. The game was released in North America in June 1990 and in Europe the next year for the NES. It was also released for the PlayChoice-10 arcade machine.

It features music by composer David Wise.

Gameplay
The game is very reminiscent of the Sega classic Zaxxon. The game features top-down scrolling overhead isometric graphics, including simulated 3D terrain. The terrain mimics the look of flight simulators available for the PC at the time. The game player is the pilot of the plane, code-named the F-14VTS (a fictional version of the F-14), and must avoid the mountainous terrain while annihilating aliens.

There are a total of nine missions in the game. The first seven have three objectives each while missions eight and nine have two objectives and one objective, respectively. Each level has multiple routes, some of which allow the player to bypass large gatherings of hostiles. The objectives vary across missions and include destroying an enemy base, dropping supplies, fighting aerial battles, picking up a scientist, and docking with a space station.

Weapons
The player can fire four types of weapons: Cannon, Phoenix Air Intercept Missiles, Maverick air-to-ground missiles, and Hawk bombs. The cannon is the only weapon with an unlimited supply. The rest of the weapons must be purchased between missions after docking with the space station. The purchases are made with credits obtained through the levels by destroying all aliens that are in a group.  Purchasing additional cannons allows the player to fire much more rapidly.

Level design
Each main level in Captain Skyhawk is an isometric plane. After the boss of the stage is destroyed or the packages are delivered the player moves on to a rear-facing 2D screen where he must destroy the enemy planes to gain credits to buy weapons in the space station on the end of the levels.  The last space station is replaced with the alien mother-ship.

Story
The player takes a role of a fighter pilot working to repel an alien invasion. Aliens have invaded Earth, and have built four land bases. These bases are designed to drain Earth's energy and feed it to their mother space station. If the space station is allowed to obtain enough energy, it will destroy the Earth with a massive laser blast. The player must destroy the enemy bases, then go after the space station itself. Scientists, during the course of the game, are working on a top-secret Neutron Cannon. During several missions, the player must make supply drops to the scientists working underground. Sometimes, the aliens will have a scientist captive. Then the player must defeat the alien base and take the scientist to safety.

References

External links

 Captain Skyhawk (NES) at MobyGames

1990 video games
Milton Bradley Company video games
Nintendo Entertainment System games
PlayChoice-10 games
Rare (company) games
Scrolling shooters
Single-player video games
Video games developed in the United Kingdom
Video games scored by David Wise
Video games with isometric graphics